Overwolf is a software platform designed to help developers create extensions for video games, which are then offered to users through Overwolf's App Store.  The platform was created by Overwolf Ltd., and extensions are often focused on providing in-game services that would normally require a user to exit the game, such as the use of a web browser or an IM client. Other extensions provide game-specific features that can remind users about certain in-game events, easing the game experience. The platform has gained traction in competitive video games, such as esports and MMORPGs, where native extensions are often forbidden due to concerns about cheating.  Overwolf extensions sidestep this concern, since they do not interact with the game engine; they operate exclusively on the overlay created by the main Overwolf program.

History 
Overwolf was founded in 2010 by Uri Marchand, Gil Or, Alon Ranowitz and Nir Finkelstein with a cash seed investment from Joseph (Yossi) Vardi. In September 2013, another $5.3 million was invested by Venture Capital Marker LLC. At the start of the Beta release, Overwolf had 50,000 users. As of early 2013, Overwolf had reached 1 million users and grew to 5.5 million installs by the end of 2013.

In September 2012, Overwolf opened its Software Development Kit to allow users and developers to create applications for games. An improved version of their SDK is expected to be released in mid to late 2014. At the same time, the Overwolf App Store went live allowing user created programs to be distributed to all users of Overwolf.

In June 2020, Overwolf acquired CurseForge, for an undisclosed sum, from Twitch.

In March 2022, Overwolf acquired the UK-based payment platform software specialist Tebex in a $29 million deal.

Partnerships 

Overwolf has partnered with a number of organizations.  Partnerships with organizations such as Wargaming
, Webzen, gPotato, Intel, EA, Buff and Infernum were made to promulgate the software among their user bases and to tailor versions of the software for the partner. Other partnerships, like those with Teamspeak, were made to develop special apps such as the creation of the Official Teamspeak in-game overlay.

References 

Social networking services
Companies based in Ramat Gan
Video game companies of Israel